General Sacket House is a historic home located at Cape Vincent in Jefferson County, New York.  It was built in 1872–75 and is a three-story, three-bay-wide, 25-room Second Empire style residence.  It consists of a rectangular three-story main block with a two-story rear wing.  The main block features a mansard roof pierced by round-headed dormers.  Also on the property is the original two-story carriage house.

It was listed on the National Register of Historic Places in 1985.

References

Houses on the National Register of Historic Places in New York (state)
Second Empire architecture in New York (state)
Houses completed in 1875
Houses in Jefferson County, New York
National Register of Historic Places in Jefferson County, New York